Moduza is a genus of south-east Asian (Indomalayan realm) brush-footed butterflies commonly called the commanders.

Species
Listed alphabetically:
 Moduza imitata Butler, 1883 Nias
 Moduza jumaloni (Schröder, 1976) Philippines
 Moduza lycone (Hewitson, 1859) Sulawesi, Buton, Wowoni, Muna Island, Banggai, Sula Islands
 Moduza lymire (Hewitson, 1859) Sulawesi, Buton, Muna Island, Banggai, Sula Islands, Kabaena, Togian
 Moduza mata (Moore, 1858) Philippines (Luzon, Mindanao, Cebu)
 Moduza nuydai Shirôzu & Saigusa, 1970 Philippines (Luzon)
 Moduza pintuyana (Semper, 1878) Philippines (Mindanao, Basilan)
 Moduza procris (Cramer, [1777]) – commander (south Asia and Southeast Asia)
 Moduza thespias (Semper, 1889) Philippines (Camiguin)
 Moduza urdaneta (C. & R. Felder, 1863) Philippines (Luzon, Mindanao)

References

External links
Images representing Moduza at EOL

Limenitidinae
Nymphalidae genera
Taxa named by Frederic Moore